Datu Salibo, officially the Municipality of Datu Salibo (Maguindanaon: Ingud nu Datu Salibo; Iranun: Inged a Datu Salibo), is a  municipality in the province of Maguindanao del Sur, Philippines. According to the 2020 census, it has a population of 18,795 people.

History
Muslim Mindanao Act No. 222 was enacted by the ARMM Regional Legislative Assembly and subsequently amended by MMA No. 253, creating the municipality of Salibo out 17 barangays. The ARMM act was ratified through a plebiscite conducted by the COMELEC on July 30, 2009.

It included 4 entire barangays and portions of 10 barangays from Datu Piang (Dulawan), and 2 entire barangays and a portion of one barangay from the municipality of Datu Saudi-Ampatuan.

Geography

Barangays

Datu Salibo is composed of 17 barangays.
Alonganan
Andavit
Balanakan
Buayan
Butilen
Dado
Damabalas
Duaminanga
Kalipapa
Liong
Magaslong
Masigay
Pagatin
Pandi
Penditen
Sambulawan
Tee

Climate

Demographics

Economy

References

External links
 Datu Salibo Profile at the DTI Cities and Municipalities Competitive Index
 MMA Act No. 222 : An Act Creating the Municipality of Datu Salibo in the Province of Maguindanao
 [ Philippine Standard Geographic Code]
 COMELEC - Plebiscite results for 3 new Maguindanao towns
 COMELEC Resolution No. 8169
 Local Governance Performance Management System

Municipalities of Maguindanao del Sur